Kalga is a rural locality in Russia.

Kalga may also refer to:
 Kalga, Himachal Pradesh, a village in the state of Himachal Pradesh, India
 Kalga (title), second in command and designated heir to the Khan in the Crimean Khanate